Line 12 of the Dalian Metro is a rapid transit line running in northern Dalian. It opened on 1 May 2014.

This line begins at Hekou station and stretches southwest ending at Lüshun New Port station. Similar to Line 3, all the stations have side platforms with tracks in the platform area have no ballast (gravel); however, tracks outside the station are on ballast. Also all stations are covered by a combination of transparent corrugated sheets and a concrete roof.

In October 2017, most station names were re-translated from Pinyin into conventional English.

Opening timeline

Stations

References

12
Railway lines opened in 2013
2013 establishments in China